The Five Points Historic Neighborhoods are a cluster of suburban developments centered on the Five Points intersection of Glenwood Avenue and Fairview and Whitaker Mill Roads in Raleigh, North Carolina. They include Hayes Barton, Bloomsbury, Georgetown, Vanguard Park, and Roanoke Park. All of the neighborhoods were platted in the 1910s through the early 1920s and represent Raleigh's second wave of white suburban development.

See also
 List of Registered Historic Places in North Carolina

References

External links 
 Five Points Historic District, Raleigh Historic Development Commission (RHDC)
 Five Points Historic Neighborhoods Guidesheet, RHDC

National Register of Historic Places in Raleigh, North Carolina
Historic districts in North Carolina
Neighborhoods in Raleigh, North Carolina